Cymindis dubia is a species of ground beetle in the subfamily Harpalinae. It was described by Ernst von Ballion in 1878.

References

dubia
Beetles described in 1878